Oleg Clonin (born 4 February 1988) is a Moldovan football player who plays for FC Ungheni. In 2013, he made his debut in a match against Kyrgyzstan national football team.

External links
 Oleg Clonin at sports.md

1988 births
Living people
Moldovan footballers
Moldova international footballers
Moldovan expatriate footballers
Association football defenders
FC Zimbru Chișinău players
FC Rapid Ghidighici players
FC Academia Chișinău players
CSM Ceahlăul Piatra Neamț players
FC Saxan players
FC Spicul Chișcăreni players
FC Ungheni players
Moldovan Super Liga players
Expatriate footballers in Romania
Moldovan expatriate sportspeople in Romania